Javier Rentero Barberá (born 16 March 2001) is a Spanish footballer who plays as a midfielder for CD Leganés B.

Club career
Born in Madrid, Rentero was a CD Leganés youth graduate. He made his senior debut with the reserves on 15 November 2020, starting in a 3–1 Tercera División home win over AD Parla.

Rentero scored his first senior goal on 3 February 2021, netting the B's winner in a 1–0 away success over AD Alcorcón B. 

Rentero made his first team debut on 29 May 2022, coming on as a late substitute for Juan Muñoz in a 2–2 home draw against UD Almería in the Segunda División.

References

External links
 Leganés profile 
 
 

2001 births
Living people
Footballers from Madrid
Spanish footballers
Association football midfielders
Segunda División players
Segunda Federación players
Tercera División players
CD Leganés B players
CD Leganés players